Lupus commonly refers to many lupus erythematosus autoimmune diseases,  including systemic lupus erythematosus. See lupus erythematosus#Classification for links to the many Wikipedia articles. 

Lupus may also refer to:

Arts and entertainment
 Lupus, a character in The Roman Mysteries
 Lupus, a dog in the video game Jet Force Gemini
 "Lupus", in Trash: Short Stories by Dorothy Allison

People
 Lupus (name), a given name and a family name
 Pen name of Wulfstan (died 956), Archbishop of York
 Hugh d'Avranches, 1st Earl of Chester, nicknamed Lupus (wolf) for his ferocity

Other uses
 Lupus (constellation)
 Lupus (journal), a journal in the field of rheumatology
 Lupus, Missouri, a US city
 Lupus vulgaris, cutaneous tuberculosis

See also
 Toshiba Brave Lupus, a Japanese rugby team
 Lupis (disambiguation)
 Lapis (disambiguation)
 Canis lupus, the wolf